Suremphaa (reign 1751–1769), or Rajeswar Singha, the fourth son of Rudra Singha, became the king of the Ahom kingdom after the death of his brother King Pramatta Singha. Rudra Singha's third son, Mohanmala Maladev Gohain, was considered ineligible for kingship as his face was pitted with smallpox marks. According to the norm established after Sulikphaa Lora Roja, an Ahom prince had to be free from any physical disability, defects or deformities to become a king.

The new king was installed with the usual ceremonies. His first act was to exile his brother Mohanmala Maladev Gohain as the Raja of Namrup. During his installation as king, there was a conflict of opinion about the location of the capital between the Deodhais (Ahom priests) and the Hindu astrologers, the former recommended Taimung and the latter Rangpur. The king took the advice of the Hindu astrologers and built his palace at Rangpur, but afterwards, he built another palace at Taimung. Both the buildings were of considerable size and were made of bricks.

Rajeswar Singha was a devout Hindu. He erected many temples and gifted much land to the Brahmins. Soon after his accession, he paid a long visit to Gauhati to worship at the Kamakhya and other temples. He took sharan (meaning initiation in Assamese) from Nati Gosain, the relative of Parbatiya Gosain, the head priest of Kamakhya Temple. He gave Nati Gosain a temple at Pandunath. In 1759, Rajeshwar Singha gifted 64 Bighas of land to the Basudeb temple near Nalbari, where Doul Jatra and Janmastami is celebrated annually, which was built by Siba Singha.

Rajeswar Singha also promoted the cause of the Saiva cult by constructing the Manikarnesvaar Temple (1755), making financial provision for the Sukreswar Temple (1759), and by constructing the Siddhesvara Temple at Sualkuchi (1764).  Rajeswar Singha got the Navagraha temple built upon the Citrasala hill in Guwahati. Two doors of Kedera Shiva temple of Hajo were also constructed at the instance of king Rajeswar Singha.

He was a great patron of learned men and encouraged them with gifts.

Rajeswar Singha died in 1769 after being seriously ill for twenty days.

The reign

The king, though a capable administrator, preferred pleasures to the affairs of the state.  The administration was looked after by Bakatial Gendhela Borbarua, renamed Kirti Chandra Borbarua after the Manipur expedition (see below).  Kirti Chandra was an overbearing person, disliked by the other nobles; there were attempts to assassinate him.  He learned that the Chakaripheti Buranji in Numali Borgohain's possession attributed a low and non-Ahom origin to him.  To extinguish a future challenge to his position, he had all the Buranjis collected under the Swargadeo's orders and scrutinized for this reference.  Many Buranji's were destroyed during this exercise. But, the people, in general, enjoyed peace and prosperity. There was internal order and immunity from external aggression. But, this prosperity had also brought in a lack of discipline, senior officers refused to go on active service and the overbearing Borbarua made the matter worse. The people were divided in sectarian lines influenced by priests and preachers.

During his reign, in 1758 there was a conflict with the Dafla because of raids by them on the plains people near Ghiladhari. As a punishment forts were erected in the frontiers and the Daflas were prohibited from entering the plains. But later an agreement was made with the Daflas which allowed them to collect paddy and payment of cowries from the people living in along the foot of the hills on condition of their refraining from any acts of aggression.

In July 1765, it was found necessary to take similar punitive measures against the Mikirs. The Ahom army entered the hills via Chapanala, and the Kopili and Jamuna rivers took the Mikirs by surprise. The defeated Mikirs then came with tributes and begged forgiveness.

In November 1765, Rajeswar Singha sent an envoy to summon to his presence the Kachari King Sandhikari, but the latter refused to receive the messenger. On hearing this the king dispatched the army led by the Borbarua to Raha. This had the desired effect and the Kachari king came and made his submission. During this visit the Kachari king was accompanied by Raja Jai Singh of Manipur, who had taken shelter with him, owing to the invasion of Manipur by the Burmese.

Expedition to Manipur

Later, Jai Singh of Manipur made a personal appeal to Rajeswar Singha in his court to help him drive out the Burmese from his kingdom. Rajeswar Singha consulted his ministers and sent an army consisting of mul and dewal paiks in 1765 commanded by Haranath Senapati Phukan to Manipur directly over the hills south of Charaideo to reinstate Jai Singh. But the jungle was extremely dense so the work of clearing a road was laborious and time-consuming. The troops suffered great hardship, lack of food and many died from raiding Naga tribesmen and snake bites. The king ordered the return of the army.  This unsuccessful expedition came to be known as the Lotakota ron (War of the Creepers).

In November 1768 an army of ten thousand soldiers led by Keertichandra Borbarua was dispatched this time via Raha and the Kachari kingdom accompanied by Jai Singh. The Ahom army camped near Mirap river, where it remained until Jai Singh raised a force to drive out the usurper Kelemba, who have been placed on the throne as the King of Manipur by the Burmese. Jai Singh on becoming the king in 1773 sent valuable gift to Rajeswar Singha and also gave his daughter Kuranganayani in marriage. A number of Manipuri families who accompanied the princess were settled near the confluence of Desoi river at Magalu Khat about four miles west of the Jorhat. Rajeswar Singha established the Magalus or Manipuris (Magalu was the old Assamese name for Manipuris; Khat meaning Estate in Assamese) here after marrying the princess of Manipur at Manaimaji village in 1768. Princess of Manipur  Kuranganayani became the chief queen of Rajeswar Singha.

Kuranganayani became a queen to the next Ahom king Lakshmi Singha and subsequently was forced into the seraglio of Ragh Neog, a rebel leader in the first phase of the Moamoria rebellion.  She was instrumental in the conspiracy and the execution of Ragh Neog's assassination in 1770 which triggered the end of the first phase of the rebellion.

Other works
Like his father, Rajeswar Singha constructed many temples and renovated the palaces. Notable among his contribution is the present existing structure of the seven-storied palace of Garhgaon which was built around 1752. Rajeshwar Singha added three underground stories known as Talatal Ghar made of brick and an indigenous type of cement to the four-storied Kareng Ghar (or palace) at Rangpur. The Talatalghar had two secret tunnels connected to the Dikhow river and the Garhgaon Palace for use as an escape route in case of any enemy attack. The Borbheti Than which about 7 km from Jorhat town was built during his reign. His most notable contribution among temples of Assam is the building of the unique Navagraha temple in Guwahati.

Administrative Works
The administrative works of Rajeshwar Singha are- Vashisthashramar Mandir, Monikarneswarar Mandir, Chitrachal Mandir,Naba Graha Mandir,Negheriting Debalaya,Har Gauri Dol, Sukreswar Mandir, Kamakhyar Nat Mandir, Dirgheswari Mandir,Kedar Mandir, Moglau Pukhuri, Sil Pukhuri, Gauhati, Ranurar Talatal Ghar, Nati Gosainr Dol, Rangpur Saru Rangghar, Garhgaon Talatal Ghar, Bahikhowa Bar Phukanar Ali, Luthuri Kath,Katiya Barua Ali, Deka Barbarua Ali

See also
 Ahom Dynasty
Ahom kingdom
Lata Kata ran

Notes

References

 Gogoi, Padmeswar (1968) The Tai and the Tai kingdoms, Gauhati University, Guwahati.
 Barpujari, H. K., The Comprehensive History of Assam, Vol-III, Publication Board, Assam. 

 Naoboicha Phukan, Padmeswar., Asom Buranji, Publication Board,Assam, Guwahati-781 021

Ahom kings
Ahom kingdom
1769 deaths
Year of birth unknown
Hindu monarchs